Cymatocarpus may refer to:
 Cymatocarpus (flatworm), a genus of flatworms in the family Brachycoeliidae
 Cymatocarpus (plant), a genus of flowering plants in the family Brassicaceae